The Break is a 1995 film directed by Lee H. Katzin. It stars Vincent Van Patten as Nick, a former tennis player turned coach to a new up and coming player, and Rae Dawn Chong as a former girlfriend. The film appeared during the 1990s, mostly on cable TV.

Cast
Vincent Van Patten as Nick Irons
Rae Dawn Chong as Jennifer Hudson
Martin Sheen as Gil Robbins
Valerie Perrine as Delores Smith
Betsy Russell as Candy
Ben Jorgensen as Joel Robbins

References

External links

1995 films
Films directed by Lee H. Katzin
Tennis films
1990s English-language films